The ocellated thrasher (Toxostoma ocellatum) is a species of bird in the family Mimidae. It is endemic to Mexico.

Taxonomy and systematics

The ocellated thrasher has two subspecies, the nominate T. o. ocellatum and T. o. villai.

Description

Adults' upperparts are dark brown and have a slight olive wash. They have a dull white to buff supercilium and brown cheeks. The folded wings show two white bars and the outer tail feathers have narrow white tips. The underparts are whitish darkening to buff on the belly and brown on the flanks. The breast, sides, and flanks have bold black spots.

Distribution and habitat

The nominate subspecies of ocellated thrasher is found in central Mexico from San Luis Potosí south to the states of Hidalgo and México. T. o. villai is found in southern Mexico between Puebla and Oaxaca.

The ocellated thrasher inhabits a variety of landscapes including arid and semi-arid scrub and the brushy understory of oak and pine-oak forests.

Behavior

Feeding

The ocellated thrasher forages mostly in dense vegetation, on the ground or near it. Though its diet has not been documented, it is presumed to be mostly arthropods, other invertebrates, and possibly fruit.

Breeding

Very little is known about the ocellated thrasher's breeding phenology. Its nest is a cup made of twigs and grass sited in a bush or tree. The clutch size is believed to be two.

Vocalization

The ocellated thrasher's song is "a varied, rich warbling in which phrases are repeated two or three times", often sung from atop a bush or tree. Its calls include "a hard, slightly smacking to gruff chehk or tchehk".

Status

The IUCN has assessed the ocellated thrasher as being of Least Concern. However, it has a fairly small range and its population and population trend are unknown.

References

Further reading

 Peterson, Roger Tory & Edward L. Chalif (1973) A Field Guide to Mexican Birds, Houghton Mifflin.
 van Perlo, Ber (2006) A Field Guide to the Birds of Mexico and Central America, Collins.

ocellated thrasher
Endemic birds of Mexico
ocellated thrasher
ocellated thrasher
Taxonomy articles created by Polbot
Tehuacán Valley matorral